The Lyuboseyevka is a river in Moscow Oblast, Russia. It is a right tributary of the Vorya. It is 12 km in length. Its source is near the town of Fryazino. Flows all over on the east, passing the manor of Grebnevo and entering the Vorya near the settlement of Mednoye-Vlasovo.

References

Russian: Wagner B.B. Rivers and lakes near Moscow. — M.: Veche, 2007. P. 224–228. .

Rivers of Moscow Oblast